François-Louis(-Ferdinand)  Henry (12 May 1786 – 22 February 1855) was a French baritone, who sang for about 35 years with the Opéra-Comique in Paris, where he created numerous leading roles. His stage name was Henri (or Henry). He has also been referred to as François-Louis Deshayes.

Birth and identity
He was born in Versailles with the family name of Deshayes. Relatively little is known about his life, and during his career at the Opéra-Comique he was only identified as Henry or Henri. However, it is as good as certain that he is identical with François-Louis Henry, who attended, and later taught at, the Conservatoire de Paris.

Paris Conservatory
Henry first attended the conservatory as a supernumerary, beginning on 13 May 1803. He became a coach (répétiteur) without pay on 23 May 1808 and professor of singing preparation (préparation au chant) on 1 July, again without pay. He was a student of Charles Simon Catel, a professor of harmony, and won a second prize in harmony in 1810.

On 1 April 1816 Henry was appointed to a paid position as professor of vocalization (vocalisation). Among his students were Julie Dorus and Cornélie Falcon, who both later became leading sopranos at the Paris Opera. He became a professor of singing (chant) for a two-year trial (prior to 9 June 1835) and received his permanent position as professor of singing on 1 January 1837. He retired on 15 November 1842.

Opéra-Comique

The first record of Henry having sung at the Opéra-Comique is on 29 June 1813 in the premiere of Boieldieu's opera Le nouveau seigneur de village. The singer's most noteworthy creations there included Gaveston in Boieldieu's La dame blanche (1825) and Sergeant Sulpice in Donizetti's La fille du régiment (1840). He also sang at the premiere of George Onslow's opera Le duc de Guise. He continued to appear regularly with the company until 1849.

On 6 December 1846 Henry sang Brander in the premiere of Berlioz's La damnation de Faust, a concert performance at the Opéra-Comique conducted by the composer. He also sang the role under Berlioz on 15 March 1847 at the Mikhaylovsky Theatre in Saint Petersburg, 18 April 1847 at the Maly Theatre in Moscow, and 10 June 1847 at the Neues Königliches Schauspielhaus in Berlin.

After about 1845 Henry was also active as a stage director at the Opéra-Comique. His stagings included the premieres of  Halévy's 3-act Les mosquetaires de la reine on 3 February 1846, Xavier Boisselot's 3-act Ne touchez pas à la reine! on 16 January 1847, Halévy's 3-act Le val d'Andorre on 11 November 1848, and Armand Limnander's 3-act Les Monténégrins on 31 March 1849.

Henry's farewell performance was in 1850 (after his official retirement), when he performed Fortunatus in Auber's L'ambassadrice.

He died in Paris.

Roles created

Notes

Bibliography
 
 Kutsch, K. J. and Riemens, Leo (2003). Großes Sängerlexikon (fourth edition, in German). Munich: K. G. Saur. .
 Pierre, Constant, editor (1900). Le Conservatoire national de musique et de déclamation. Documents historiques et administratifs. Paris: Imprimerie Nationale. 1031 pages. View at Google Books.
 Pitou, Spire (1990). The Paris Opéra: An Encyclopedia of Operas, Ballets, Composers, and Performers. Growth and Grandeur, 1815–1914. New York: Greenwood Press. .
 Warrack, John and West, Ewan (1992). The Oxford Dictionary of Opera.  Oxford: Oxford University Press. .
 Wild, Nicole; Charlton, David (2005). Théâtre de l'Opéra-Comique Paris: répertoire 1762-1972. Sprimont, Belgium: Editions Mardaga. .

1786 births
1855 deaths
French operatic baritones
People from Versailles
Academic staff of the Conservatoire de Paris
Conservatoire de Paris alumni
19th-century French male opera singers